José Braulio Bedia Valdés (born January 13, 1959 in Havana, Cuba) is a Cuban painter currently residing in Florida.

Bedia studied at the Escuela Nacional de Bellas Artes "San Alejandro" and then finished his art studies at the Instituto Superior de Arte in Havana. He escaped Cuba in 1990, settling initially in Mexico and subsequently, in 1993, in the United States.

Selected individual exhibitions
1989 – Final del Centauro – Castillo de la Real Fuerza, Havana, Cuba.
1992 – "Jose Bedia: De Donde Vengo (Where I Come From)" – Museum of Contemporary Art, San Diego, CA.
1994 – José Bedia: De Donde Vengo – Institute of Contemporary Art, University of Pennsylvania.
2004 – Estremecimientos – Museo Extremeño e Iberoamericano de Arte Contemporaneo (MEIAC), Badajoz, Spain.
September 18, 2011 – January 8, 2012 – Transcultural Pilgrim: Three Decades of Work by José Bedia – Fowler Museum, UCLA.

Collective exhibitions
In 1978 he began participating with other artists in several collective exhibitions. In 1980 he conformed the exhibition XIX Premi Internacional de Dibuix Joan Miró. Fundació Joan Miró, Centre d’Estudis d’Art Contemporani, Parc de Montjuic, Barcelona, Spain; Los novísimos cubanos. Grupo Volumen I was a significant exhibition that took place at The Signs Gallery, New York. He was selected to participate in the Cubans exhibition in the 1st and 2nd Havana Biennial Bienal de La Habana, Museo Nacional de Bellas Artes. In 1990 he was in the XLIV Exposizione Internazionale d’Arte, Biennale di Venezia, Venice, Italy. In 1994, his work was exhibited at "InSite94: A Binational Exhibition of Installation and Site Specific Art" San Diego Train Station, San Diego, California. In 2001 his work was part of Inside and Out, Contemporary Sculpture, Video and Installations, Bass Museum of Art, IV Bienal del Caribe y Centroamérica, Museo de Arte Moderno, Santo Domingo, Dominican Republic. In 2013 Bedia participated in the collective exhibit Drapetomania: Exposicion Homenaje a Grupo Antillano in Santiago de Cuba.

Awards
He has obtained several awards for his artistic work:
 1982 – First Prize in the "Salón Paisaje ’82", Museo Nacional de Bellas Artes de La Habana, Havana, Cuba.
 1993 – International Guggenheim Fellowship, New York City.
 1988 – Distinction for the National Culture, Cuban Council of State, Havana, Cuba.

Collections
His pieces can be found in the permanent collections of:
 George Adams Gallery, New York City
 Arkansas Art Center, Little Rock, Arkansas
 Birmingham Museum of Art, Birmingham, Alabama
 Cantor Arts Center, Stanford University, California
 Galería Nina Menocal in México
 Honolulu Museum of Art, Honolulu, Hawaii
 Loeb Art Center, Vassar College, Poughkeepsie, New York
 Ludwig Forum für Internationale Kunst, Aachen, Germany
 Perez Art Museum Miami, Miami, Florida
 Porin Taidemuseo, Finland
 Centro Wifredo Lam, Havana
 Museo Nacional de Bellas Artes de La Habana, Havana
 NSU Art Museum, Fort Lauderdale, Florida
de la Cruz Collection, Florida
Kendall Art Center, Miami, Florida
Frost Art Museum, Miami, Florida
The von Christierson Collection, United Kingdom
Farber Collection, Florida

Bibliography
 Jose Bedia Works 1978-2006, Turner, 2007.
 Jose Bedia: Transcultural Pilgrim, Bettelheim and Berlo, 2012.
 José Bedia: Estremecimientos, Omar-Pascual Castillo, 2004.
Jose Viegas; Memoria: Artes Visuales Cubanas Del Siglo Xx; (California International Arts 2004); .

References

External links

Oral history interview with José Bedia, 1998, February 13 from the Smithsonian Archives of American Art
Transcultural Pilgrim: Three Decades of Work by José Bedia at the Fowler Museum, UCLA
josebedia.com (Personal Website of Jose Bedia)

Living people
1959 births
Artists from Havana
Cuban contemporary artists
Cuban male painters
Instituto Superior de Arte alumni
Academia Nacional de Bellas Artes San Alejandro alumni